Jack 'Action' Zwerner (born June 12, 1938) is a business entrepreneur. Zwerner is known for owning and operating casinos, both land based and gaming vessels in international waters, and shaping the casino world as it is today. He is also known for winning the 2006 World Series of Poker (WSOP) Event 8: Omaha Hi-Lo (8 or better). T. J. Cloutier regards him as the best heads-up Omaha player ever.

Early life 
Zwerner was born in Atlanta, Georgia and raised in Miami, Florida. He attended the University of Miami and, later, Miami Dade College. He left college to move to Shaker Heights, Ohio and entered in the world of business and insurance. As an executive of 10 years with the New England Mutual Life Company, Zwerner conducted business with some of the firm's largest clients and laid strong foundations for his future career. In this regard, Zwerner had clients invest in a variety of corporate policies worth tens of millions of dollars, generating consistent and impressive revenues for the New England Mutual Life Insurance Company.

Business life 
At the end of his tenure in the insurance industry, Zwerner relocated to Las Vegas, Nevada, to launch his career in casino management and marketing. Operating at the highest ladders of the business, he enjoyed strong and profitable relationships with some of the biggest and most influential casino owners in Las Vegas, including Cliff Perlman, Morris Shenker, Ed Torres, Steve Wynn, and Barron Hilton. During this time, he held roles as Senior Vice President of Casino Operations and Marketing, and Executive positions for such seminal venues as the Dunes Hotel, Sands, Aladdin, the New Frontier Hotel and Casino, the Golden Nugget, and the Las Vegas Hilton. Players Jack brought to the casinos included some of the most successful people in the world: Roger King (King World–producers and owners of Oprah Winfrey show, Jeopardy, and Wheel of Fortune), Jerry Buss & Frank Mariani (owners of the LA Lakers), Kamel Nacife of Mexico, Kerry Packer of Australia, Sioma Neiman of Mexico City, and Akio Kashawagi of Japan. His players brought hundreds of millions to the casinos over the years. His brilliance was even played out on the big screen in the movie Casino. He was the founder and owner of the San Manuel Band of Mission Indians Hotel Casino in San Bernardino, California and co-founder of Treasure Bay Casino, located in Biloxi, Mississippi. In 1987, he was licensed as Honorary Deputy Sheriff of Clark County by Sheriff John Moran.

He currently owns a licensed brokerage real estate company in the states of Nevada, Florida, and California.

Casino Executive 
In 1979, he was a key executive of the Casino and Marketing Department at the Aladdin Hotel & Casino until 1981 when he founded the San Manuel Band of Mission Indians Hotel & Casino which was, at the time, the second largest Indian gaming casino in America.

He was the Senior Vice President of the Dunes Casino & Hotel from 1982 to 1983 and again in 1988 to 1989. In 1983 he left the Dunes and worked as the Senior Vice President of Marketing and Casino at the Las Vegas Hilton Casino with Barron Hilton and Dennis Gomes, where he worked until 1990. While working at the Las Vegas Hilton, he was licensed with the Nevada Gaming Commission as a key employee with a Liquor Gaming License.

In 1990, he held Senior Vice President positions at the Sands Hotel Casino, the Frontier Hotel & Casino, and Executive VP at the Golden Nugget with Steve Wynn. In 1992, he co-founded the $200 million Treasure Bay Hotel & Casino in Biloxi, Mississippi and Tunica, Mississippi.

Poker 
Until his win at the WSOP, Jack Zwerner was known as a big cash game player. It came as little surprise though that Zwerner would do well in the tournament.

On what turned out to be the last hand of the tournament, Mandap had high hopes for his . Instead, the big pair and low-draw was crushed and counterfeited when the final board showed . Zwerner showed  with two hearts to match the three hearts on board. Zwerner's heart flush and better low trounced Mandap's hand, thus ending the event. With the final hand won, he received his first World Series of Poker bracelet and $341,426.

References

External links 
 Jack Zwerner Back After 6 Year Vacation

1938 births
American poker players
World Series of Poker bracelet winners
Living people